Schou is a Scandinavian surname. Notable people with the name include:

Jens Schou Fabricius (1758–1841), the Norwegian appointed Minister of the Navy 1817–1818
Laila Schou Nilsen (1919–1998), Norwegian speed skater, alpine skier and tennis player
Albert Schou (c. 1849 – 1900), Danish photographer
August Schou (1903–1984), Norwegian historian
Christian Schou (1792–1874), Norwegian merchant, farmer, brewer and politician
Corey Schou, University Professor of Informatics and Associate Dean at Idaho State University
Einar Oscar Schou (1877–1966), Norwegian architect
Eivind Schou of Serena-Maneesh, an alternative rock band from Oslo, Norway
Frida Schou (1891–1980), early Danish businesswoman, brick manufacturer
Halvor Schou (1823–1879), Norwegian industrialist
Ingjerd Schou (born 1955), Norwegian politician for the Conservative Party
Jens Christian Schou (born 1918), Danish medical doctor and Nobel laureate
Julius Schou (1849–1929), American soldier in the U.S. Army
Ludvig Abelin Schou (1838–1867), Danish Romantic painter
Mogens Schou (1918–2005), Danish psychiatrist, pioneered lithium for bipolar disorder
Peter Alfred Schou (1844–1914), Danish painter, the brother of Ludvig Abelin Schou
Schou (Norwegian family), Danish-origined Norwegian family
Tim Schou of A Friend in London, Danish pop rock and rock band
Kjell Schou-Andreassen (1940–1997), Norwegian footballer and football manager

See also
Hansen, Schou & Weller, photographic studio in Copenhagen
Chou (disambiguation)
Schout
Schouten (disambiguation)
Schouw
Skou (disambiguation)
Skov (disambiguation)
Skouv
Shou (disambiguation)